My Name Is Victor Gazon is a Canadian short comedy-drama film, directed by Patrick Gazé and released in 2008. The film stars Claudel Poirier as the titular Victor Gazon, a young boy enumerating the pros and cons of living for a suicide prevention project at school, soon after his own uncle has committed suicide.

The film was named to the Toronto International Film Festival's annual year-end Canada's Top Ten list for 2008. It was a Genie Award nominee for Best Live Action Short Drama at the 29th Genie Awards, and a Prix Jutra nominee for Best Short Film at the 11th Jutra Awards.

References

External links
 

2008 films
Canadian comedy-drama films
Films shot in Quebec
Films about suicide
French-language Canadian films
Canadian drama short films
Canadian comedy short films
2000s Canadian films